The Whalers Cabin near Carmel-by-the-Sea, California, is a historic building that is listed on the National Register of Historic Places. It is located in what is now Point Lobos State Natural Reserve, four miles south of Carmel.

The cabin was built in the 1850s to house Japanese and Chinese fishermen. Shore whaling was conducted here by the Carmel Whaling Company from 1862 to 1884 and by the Japanese Whaling Company from 1898 to 1900. The building now houses a museum dedicated to cultural history of the area. The museum also highlights the history of Point Lobos, including its cinematic appearances and plans at the turn of the 20th century to develop the area for densely packed suburban housing.

It was listed on the National Register in 2007; the listing included one contributing building and one contributing site.

References

External links
 Whalers Cabin – Point Lobos Foundation

Residential buildings on the National Register of Historic Places in California
Buildings and structures in Monterey County, California
Carmel-by-the-Sea, California
Museums in Monterey County, California
National Register of Historic Places in Monterey County, California